Batillum or vatillum was an ancient Roman iron shovel with a short handle used for various purposes, especially as a fire-shovel, chafing-dish, and for burning incense.

Etymology
The name is possibly related to battualia "the exercise of soldiers and gladiators in fighting and fencing" which is related to the English verb to beat or to vas a vessel (in some Latinate languages 'b' and 'v' can be interchangeable).

See also 
Entrenching tool
Roman military personal equipment

References

Bibliography 
 

Shovels
Ancient Roman military equipment